This is a list of Canadian television-related events in 1956.

Notable events

 CBC-Radio Canada microwave relay reaches Winnipeg via the TransCanada Microwave System.

Births
October 8 – Arlene Dickinson, South African-Canadian businesswoman, television personality, author and investor
October 20 – Sonja Ball, voice actress, singer and songwriter (The Busy World of Richard Scarry, Arthur)
November 26 – Don Lake, writer, producer and actor

Television programs

Programs on-air this year

CBC
Country Canada (1954-2007)
CBC News Magazine (1952-1981) 
The National (1954–present) 
The C.G.E. Show (1952-1959) 
Circle 8 Ranch (1955-1978)
Hockey Night in Canada (1952–present)
Maggie Muggins (1955–1962)
Open House (1952-1962)

Television stations

Debuts

Network affiliation changes

See also
1956 in Canada 
1956 in television

References

External links
CBC Directory of Television Series at Queen’s University (Archived March 4, 2016)